Heiko may refer to:
 Heiko (given name) (including a list of people with the name)
 Heiko (film), a 2008 short film

See also 
 HEICO
 Hayko (disambiguation)